María Fernanda Elizondo Ochoa (born 27 July 1991) is a Mexican footballer who plays as a forward for Liga MX Femenil club Tigres UANL.

Career

Early career
Fernanda Elizondo was born in Ciudad Guzmán on 27 July 1991.

Elizondo played college football in Guadalajara for the Universidad del Valle de México and for the Borregos Salvajes of the Monterrey Institute of Technology and Higher Education, where she won the 2011–12 national championship of CONADEIP and was named MVP of the season.

In 2013, Elizondo played for the San Diego State Aztecs women's soccer team, making 11 appearances with the team during the season.

Tigres UANL
In January 2018, Elizondo joined Liga MX Femenil team UANL and made her professional debut on 3 February 2018 in a match against León, where she also scored her first career goal four minutes into the game. The match ended with a 6–1 victory for UANL.

Elizondo was part of the UANL squad that won the Clausura 2018 and Clausura 2019 championships.

On 25 November 2019, Elizondo suffered a concussion in a match against Pachuca after clashing with Pachuca's goalkeeper Alejandría Godínez. She was taken to a hospital and later reported as stable.

Career statistics

Club

Honours

Club
UANL
Liga MX Femenil: Clausura 2018
Liga MX Femenil: Clausura 2019
Liga MX Femenil: Guard1anes 2020
Liga MX Femenil: Guard1anes 2021

References

External links
 

1991 births
Living people
People from Ciudad Guzmán, Jalisco
Mexican women's footballers
Footballers from Jalisco
San Diego State University alumni
San Diego State Aztecs women's soccer players
Liga MX Femenil players
Tigres UANL (women) footballers
Women's association football forwards
Mexican footballers